Richard Diana (born September 6, 1960) is a former American football running back in the National Football League who played for the Miami Dolphins. He played college football for the Yale Bulldogs.

He finished 10th in the Heisman Trophy voting in 1981, receiving three first-place votes. He retired from the Dolphins after only one season in 1982. He became an orthopedic surgeon.

References

1960 births
Living people
American football running backs
Miami Dolphins players
Yale Bulldogs football players
People from Hamden, Connecticut